Aporophyla is a genus of moths of the family Noctuidae. The genus was erected by Achille Guenée in 1841.

Species
 Aporophyla australis (Boisduval, 1829) – feathered brindle
 Aporophyla canescens (Duponchel, 1826)
 Aporophyla chioleuca (Herrich-Schäeffer, [1850])
 Aporophyla dipsalea Wiltshire, 1941
 Aporophyla lueneburgensis (Freyer, 1848) – northern deep-brown dart
 Aporophyla lutulenta (Denis & Schiffermüller, 1775) – deep brown dart
 Aporophyla nigra (Haworth, 1809) – black rustic

References